This is a list of French military equipment in the Second World war

Handguns
 MAB Model A
 MAB Model D pistol
 Modèle 1935 pistol
 Star Model 14
 MAS 1873 revolver
 Modèle 1892 revolver
 Ruby pistol
 Beretta Model 1935
 Luger P08
 Walther P38
 Walther PPK
 Smith & Wesson Model 10
 Nagant M1895
 FN M1910
 FN M1922

Rifles 
 Fusil Automatique Modele 1917
 Lebel and Berthier rifles
 Fusil MAS36
 Fusil MAS36 CR39
 M1917 Enfield, supplied by the US through Lend-lease to Free French forces
 M1918 Browning Automatic Rifle
 Meunier rifle
 De Lisle Carbine
 M1 carbine
 M1 Garand
 Mauser k98k
 Ross Rifle
 STG 44

Submachine guns 
 MAS-38
 Erma EMP-35
 Thompson M1928 and M1928A1
 MP 28
 MP40 Captured from German troops
 Delacre machine pistol
 Sten

Machine guns 
 Breda Model 30 Captured from Italian troops
 Bren light machine gun - supplied by the British
 Chauchat
 FM-24/29
 MAC 1931
 MAC 1934
 Model 1924/1929D machine gun
 St. Étienne Mle 1907
 Hotchkiss M1909 Benét–Mercié machine gun
 Hotchkiss M1914 machine gun
 Reibel machine gun
 13.2 mm Hotchkiss machine gun
 Hotchkiss M1922 machine gun
 Darne machine gun
 Lewis
 MG 42
 Madsen
 Vicker

Anti-Tank weapons 
 Boys anti-tank rifle
 25 mm Hotchkiss anti-tank gun
 47 mm APX anti-tank gun
 AC 37 anti-tank gun
 AC 47 anti-tank gun
 47 mm Model 1931 anti-tank gun
 Canon de 75 modèle 1897 modifié 1933

Anti-Aircraft weapons 
 Darne machine gun
 Hotchkiss M1929 machine gun
 Oerlikon 20 mm cannon
 25 mm Hotchkiss anti-aircraft gun
 
 Canon anti-aérien de 75mm modèle 1939

Artillery 
 Canon d'Infanterie de 37 modèle 1916 TRP
 Lahitolle 95 mm cannon
 Canon Court de 105 M(montagne) modele 1909 Schneider
 Canon Court de 105 M(montagne) modele 1919 Schneider
 Canon de 105 court mle 1934 Schneider
 Canon de 105 court mle 1935 B
 Canon de 105 L mle 1936 Schneider
 Canon de 105 mle 1913 Schneider
 Canon de 155 C modèle 1915 St. Chamond
 Canon de 155 C modèle 1917 Schneider
 Canon de 155mm GPF
 Canon de 194 mle GPF
 Canon de 65 M (montagne) modele 1906
 Canon de 75 M(montagne) modele 1919 Schneider
 Canon de 75 M(montagne) modele 1928
 Canon de 75 modèle 1897
 Mortier de 280 modèle 1914 Schneider

Grenades and mines 
 F1 grenade (France)
 Modèle 1939 (mine)

Mortars 
 Brandt Mle 1935
 Brandt mle 27/31
Lance Grenades de 50 mm modèle 37
 Mortier de 150 mm T Mle 1917 Fabry

Armoured vehicles 

Armoured cars
 AM Gendron SOMUA 39
 AMC Schneider P 16
 AMD Laffly 80AM
 AMD Panhard 165
 AMDL Panhard
 Berliet VUDB
 Berliet VUDB4
 Citroen-Kegresse M23
 Laffly S15 TOE
 Laffly 50AM
 Panhard 178

Armoured personnel carriers
Armoured personnel carriers
 Lorraine 37L \ 38L

Armoured utility vehicles 

 Renault UE Chenillette
 Lorraine 37L

Tanks 
Light tanks
 AMR 33
 AMR 35
 FCM 36
 Hotchkiss H35, and derived variants
 Renault FT
 Renault R-35
 Renault R-40
 Char D1

Medium tanks
 Char D2

Cavalry tanks
 SOMUA S35
 Char G1 (Prototype)

Armoured combat tanks
 AMC 34
 AMC 35

Heavy tanks
Char B1
 Char 2C
 ARL 44 (Prototype)
 AMX M4 (Prototype for the AMX 50.)
 AMX 50 (Later replace with the AMX 30.)
 FCM F1 (Prototype)

See also 

 List of French World War II military equipment

Notes

 
Weapons
France World War II
Military history of France during World War II